Caledonia is a town in Lowndes County, Mississippi, United States, northeast of Columbus. The population was 1,041 at the 2010 census.

History

Caledonia was originally known as Yeggerstown, named after the abundant number of Yeggers (now Eggers) who settled there in the 1830s. According to the Caledonia Public Library, the town was renamed by one of the Yeggers who saw a blonde girl he aspired to romance named Caledonia.

Former mayors of Caledonia include George Gerhart, Don Myers, and Walton O. Willis.

Geography

Climate
<div style="width:75%">

</div style>

Demographics

As of the 2010 United States Census, there were 1,041 people living in the town. 92.7% were White, 4.0% African American, 0.3% Native American, 0.9% Asian, 0.2% Pacific Islander, 0.3% from some other race and 1.6% of two or more races. 2.4% were Hispanic or Latino of any race.

As of the census of 2000, there were 1,015 people,  365 households, and 287 families living in the town. The population density was 360.4 people per square mile (139.0/km2). There were 395 housing units at an average density of 140.3 per square mile (54.1/km2). The racial makeup of the town was 94.19% White. 3.94% African American, 0.10% Native American, 0.49% Asian, 0.30% from other races, and 0.99% from two or more races. Hispanic or Latino of any race were 1.18% of the population. In 2012, there were 1,030 people. In 2014, there were 1,041 people.

There were 365 households, out of which 41.9% had children under the age of 18 living with them, 62.7% were married couples living together, 10.1% had a female householder with no husband present, and 21.1% were non-families. 19.5% of all households were made up of individuals, and 8.5% had someone living alone who was 65 years of age or older. The average household size was 2.78 and the average family size was 3.17.

In the town, the population was spread out, with 30.3% under the age of 18, 8.7% from 18 to 24, 30.2% from 25 to 44, 22.5% from 45 to 64, and 8.3% who were 65 years of age or older. The median age was 34 years. For every 100 females, there were 97.5 males. For every 100 females age 18 and over, there were 89.0 males.

The median income for a household in the town was $41,071, and the median income for a family was $50,625. Males had a median income of $32,159 versus $22,051 for females. The per capita income for the town was $16,798. About 3.3% of families and 8.0% of the population were below the poverty line, including 9.6% of those under age 18 and 23.8% of those age 65 or over.

Schools
The Town of Caledonia is served by the Lowndes County School District. It is home to Caledonia Elementary School, consisting of grades K-5, Caledonia Middle School, grades 6-8, and Caledonia High school, grades 9-12, together are called Caledonia School. The current high school building opened August 1986 after the passage of a county bond issue in November 1984. The new building replaced the historic auditorium that burned down in 1982. The elementary is the first level 5 school in the district. The school's nickname is the Cavaliers and the school colors are cardinal red and white. The school along with Amory school district are the best school districts in North Mississippi. Caledonia offers more Advanced Placement classes than Columbus, West Lowndes, or New Hope schools.

The high school was heavily damaged by a tornado on January 10, 2009. The part of the school that was hit has now been rebuilt. The school has rebuilt the vo-tech center and has gotten a new middle school gym.

References

Towns in Lowndes County, Mississippi
Towns in Monroe County, Mississippi
Towns in Mississippi